The cola wars are the long-time rivalry between soft drink producers The Coca-Cola Company and PepsiCo, who have engaged in mutually-targeted marketing campaigns for the direct competition between each company's product lines, especially their flagship colas, Coca-Cola and Pepsi. Beginning in the late 1970s and into the 1980s, the competition escalated until it became known as the cola wars.

History
In 1886, John Stith Pemberton, a pharmacist from Atlanta, Georgia, developed the original recipe for Coca-Cola. By 1888, control of the recipe was acquired by Asa Griggs Candler, who in 1896, founded The Coca-Cola Company.
Two years later, in 1898, Caleb Bradham renamed his "Brad’s Drink" to "Pepsi-Cola," and formed the Pepsi-Cola Company in 1902, prompting the beginning of the cola wars. 

The two companies continued to introduce new and contemporary advertising techniques, such as Coke's first celebrity endorsement and 1915 contour bottle, until market instability following World War I forced Pepsi to declare bankruptcy in 1923. In 1931, Pepsi went bankrupt once more, but recovered and began selling its products at an affordable 5 cents per bottle, reigniting the cola wars through to today. Pepsi offered to sell out to Coca-Cola following both of its bankruptcies during this time, but Coca-Cola declined each time.

Advertising strategies

Coca-Cola

Coca-Cola advertising has historically focused on wholesomeness and nostalgia. Coca-Cola advertising is often characterized as "family-friendly" and often relies on "cute" characters (e.g., the Coca-Cola polar bears mascot and Santa Claus around Christmas).

"New Coke"
During the peak of the cola wars, as Coca-Cola saw its flagship product losing market share to Pepsi as well as to Diet Coke and competitors products, the company considered a change to the beverage's formula and flavor. In April 1985, The Coca-Cola Company introduced its new formula for Coca-Cola, which became popularly known as "New Coke". Consumer backlash to the change led to the company making a strategic retreat on July 11, 1985, announcing its plans to bring back the previous formula under the name "Coca-Cola Classic". Some think the decision to replace the original flavor was actually a strategic masterstroke to bolster Coke sales once it came back on the market, which it did; however, the Coca-Cola Company vehemently denies the claim.

Pepsi
Pepsi advertising is heavily supported by strategic sponsorships and online marketing. Pepsi's logo utilizes the red, white and blue colors of the Flag of the United States, drawing on a strong sense of patriotism throughout its branding.

Pepsi Challenge
In 1975, Pepsi began showing advertisements based on the Pepsi Challenge, in which ordinary people were asked which product they preferred in blind taste tests. The campaign suggested that, when it came down to taste alone, consumers preferred Pepsi over Coca-Cola. This prompted Coca-Cola's creation of "Diet Coke," and later on, "New Coke," both of which led to a major shifting point in the cola wars. However, the Pepsi Challenge was a marketing campaign and not scientific study. Subsequent studies with scientific controls found only modest differences between Pepsi and Coke.

"Pepsi Stuff"
In the mid-1990s, Pepsi launched its most successful long-term strategy of the cola wars, Pepsi Stuff. Using the slogan "Drink Pepsi, Get Stuff", consumers could collect Pepsi Points on packages and cups which could be redeemed for free Pepsi merchandise. After researching and testing the program for over two years to ensure that it resonated with consumers, Pepsi launched Pepsi Stuff, which was an instant success. Due to its success, the program was expanded to include Mountain Dew and Pepsi's international markets worldwide. The company continued to run the program for many years, continually innovating with new features each year. This line of commercials led to the court case Leonard v. Pepsico, Inc., which was chronicled in the 2022 Netflix show Pepsi, Where's My Jet?

Super Bowl LIII
Super Bowl LIII was played in Atlanta, which is where Coca-Cola has its head office, in 2019. Pepsi had been a major sponsor of the NFL for years, most recently renewing its sponsorship deal in 2011. Pepsi advertising tied to the game poked fun at the situation with slogans such as "Pepsi in Atlanta. How Refreshing", "Hey Atlanta, Thanks For Hosting. We'll Bring The Drinks", and "Look Who's in Town for Super Bowl LIII". Both companies ran television ads during the Super Bowl, as Coca-Cola aired the commercial "A Coke is a Coke" just before the Super Bowl's National Anthem, while Pepsi ran a series of ads with the tagline "Is Pepsi OK?".

Comparison of products
Many of the brands available from the three largest soda producers, The Coca-Cola Company, PepsiCo and Keurig Dr Pepper, are intended as direct, equivalent competitors. The following chart lists these competitors by type or flavor of drink.

See also

 Burger wars
 Chicken Sandwich Wars
 Coffee wars
 Console wars
 Format wars
 Smartphone wars
 Browser wars
 Max Headroom
 Tar derby

References

Cola
Advertising
Business rivalries
Coca-Cola
PepsiCo
Mass media rivalries